Jingwei is a bird in Chinese mythology, who was transformed from Yandi's daughter Nüwa. She is also a goddess in Chinese mythology. After she drowned when playing in the Eastern Sea, she metamorphosed into a bird called Jingwei. Jingwei is determined to fill up the sea, so she continuously carries a pebble or twig in her mouth and drops it into the Eastern Sea.

Classic version
The story is recorded in the Shanhaijing:

The poet Tao Qian mentioned Jingwei in his Thirteen Poems upon Reading the Guideways through Mountains and Seas, where he made an association between Jingwei and Xingtian in their persistence to overcome tragedies but also mentions their inability to be free from it:

"[Jingwei] bites hold of twigs, determined to fill up the deep-blue sea. Xingtian dances wildly with spear and shield, his old ambitions still burn fiercely. After blending with things, no anxieties should remain. After metamorphosing, all one's regrets should flee. In vain do they cling to their hearts from the past. How can they, a better day, foresee?"

In popular culture
Jingwei has a dialogue with the sea where the sea scoffs at her, saying that she won't be able to fill it up even in a million years, whereupon she retorts that she will spend ten million years, even one hundred million years, whatever it takes to fill up the sea so that others would not have to perish as she did. From this myth comes the Chinese chengyu (four-character idiom) "Jingwei Tries To Fill the Sea" (精衛填海), meaning dogged determination and perseverance in the face of seemingly impossible odds.

She is also a playable Smite heroine.

Fruit fly genetics
Professor Manyuan Long of the University of Chicago named a Drosophila gene (jgw) after Jingwei because it is - like the princess - "reincarnated" with a new function and a new appearance (structure). Related genes were named following Chinese mythology.

See also
Birds in Chinese mythology

External links
 Wang, Wen, et al. "The Origin of the Jingwei Gene and the Complex Modular Structure of Its Parental Gene, Yellow Emperor, in Drosophila melanogaster". From Molecular Biology and Evolution, Volume 17, Issue 9, 1 September 2000, Pages 1294–1301.

Notes

References

Bibliography
 
 

Mythological and legendary Chinese birds
Chinese goddesses